Nikola Nešović (born 17 October 1993) is a Serbian footballer, who plays as a forward for FK Sloboda Užice.

Honours
Napredak Kruševac
Serbian First League: 2015–16

References

External links
 
 Nikola Nešović stats at utakmica.rs
 Nikola Nešović stats at footballdatabase.eu

1993 births
Living people
Sportspeople from Čačak
Association football defenders
Serbian footballers
FK Borac Čačak players
FK Mladi Radnik players
FK Napredak Kruševac players
FK Sloboda Užice players
FK Zemun players
OFK Žarkovo players
Serbian First League players
Serbian SuperLiga players